Leptoglossis is a genus of flowering plants belonging to the family Solanaceae.

Its native range is Peru to Argentina.

Species
Species:

Leptoglossis albiflora 
Leptoglossis darcyana 
Leptoglossis ferreyraei 
Leptoglossis linifolia 
Leptoglossis lomana 
Leptoglossis schwenckioides

References

Solanaceae
Solanaceae genera